Epitranus is a genus of wasps belonging to the family Chalcididae.

The species of this genus are found in Africa and Australia.

Species:

Epitranus albipennis 
Epitranus aligarhensis 
Epitranus anervosus

References

Chalcidoidea
Hymenoptera genera